is a former Japanese football player.

Playing career
Ubukata was born in Tokyo on November 15, 1978. He joined J2 League club Albirex Niigata in 2001. However he could only play a match in 2001 Emperor's Cup. In 2002, he moved to Prefectural Leagues club Thespa Kusatsu. The club was promoted to Regional Leagues in 2003 and Japan Football League in 2004. In 2004, Thespa won the 3rd place and was promoted to J2 from 2005. However he retired end of 2004 season without playing J2.

Club statistics

References

Football Japan profile

External links
Football Japan profile

1978 births
Living people
Association football people from Tokyo
Japanese footballers
J2 League players
Japan Football League players
Albirex Niigata players
Thespakusatsu Gunma players
Association football midfielders